Gigas may refer to:
 Gigas, one of the Gigantes (Giants) in Greek mythology
 Gigas (company), a Spanish cloud services company
 Codex Gigas, a medieval manuscript
 gigue or giga, a dance

See also
A. gigas (disambiguation)
D. gigas
E. gigas (disambiguation)
G. gigas
Giygas, a villain in the EarthBound/Mother series
H. gigas (disambiguation)
M. gigas (disambiguation)
P. gigas (disambiguation)
T. gigas (disambiguation)